The Church of Humanity is a fictional organization appearing in American comic books published by Marvel Comics. It is an anti-mutant, Christian-based religious sect. It was created by Joe Casey, though Uncanny X-Men writer Chuck Austen featured the hate group in a controversial storyline which involved an elaborate plan to install the recently ordained Nightcrawler as Pope and stage a false Rapture using incendiary communion wafers as part of a plot to topple the Catholic Church (although the Rapture, as a concept, is not considered valid by Catholicism).

Fictional history
The Church of Humanity preaches that man is created in God's image, but mutants are not. They are the more radical offshoot of the Friends of Humanity anti-mutant group, but with a religious discourse, similar to the Purifiers, the followers of Reverend William Stryker. The Church of Humanity is similar to real-life white supremacist religious groups such as the Christian Identity movement.

The Church of Humanity crucified some mutants on the lawn on the X-Mansion including Skin, Magma and Jubilee. Archangel used his healing blood to revive Magma and Jubilee, but, apparently, Skin, among several others didn't have the same luck. The X-Men investigated and found the headquarters of the Church of Humanity.

Members 
 Supreme Pontiff is the leader of the Church of Humanity.
 General Vicar.
 Mister Clean.
 Mutant 143

References

External links 
 
 All-New, All-Different: Chuck Austen talks 'Uncanny X-Men'
 New Mutants Week: Magma

Christianity in popular culture controversies
Comic book terrorist organizations
X-Men supporting characters
Characters created by Chuck Austen